Christopher Jean-Louis Dilo (born 5 January 1994) is a professional footballer who plays for Djiboutian club Arta/Solar7 as a goalkeeper. Born in France, he represents Guadeloupe at international level.

Club career
Growing up in Paris, Dilo started his youth professional career at the academy of Paris Saint-Germain, the team he supported as a boy.

Blackburn Rovers and loan
However, the club released Dilo at age sixteen and he joined Blackburn Rovers despite interests from other French clubs. He later explained going to England; "Blackburn were in the Premier League at the time I signed and although I had some French clubs interested in me when I left PSG I wanted to try the UK." During the 2012–13 season, he played on loan for Hyde to gain first team experience. He made an impressive debut defeat losing 3–2 to Ebbsfleet United on 10 November 2012. After two months at Hyde, it was announced on 30 January 2013 that his loan spell had come to an end. He was released by Blackburn at the end of the 2012–13 season.

St Mirren
Dilo signed a one-year contract with Scottish Premiership club St Mirren in July 2013. Upon joining St Mirren, he soon became homesick, which was later settled down by Ludovic Roy. He became the club's number one goalkeeper in September 2013 after David Cornell was dropped. He kept his first clean sheet against Hearts at Tynecastle, a game which St Mirren won 2–0. He fell out of the first team, after making a handful of appearances, when the club signed the experienced Slovakian goalkeeper Marián Kello. After an injury to Kello, Dillo was given another opportunity and he retained his place for the last eight matches of the season keeping three clean sheets. Dilo was released by St Mirren in June 2014, after he failed to respond to the club's offer of a new contract.

Rennes
After leaving Scotland, Dilo was without a club for a number of months. On 27 September 2014, it was confirmed that has had signed a one-year contract with Stade Rennais.

Dijon

Sochaux
On 6 July 2016, departed Dijon joining FC Sochaux-Montbéliard on a one-year contract.

Paris FC
In January 2018, Dilo joined Ligue 2 side Paris FC, reportedly agreeing a six-month with the option of a further year.

International career
Dilo made his debut for the Guadeloupe national football team on 23 March 2019 in a CONCACAF Nations League qualifier against Martinique.

References

External links

 
 
 

1994 births
Living people
Sportspeople from Argenteuil
French footballers
Guadeloupean footballers
Guadeloupe international footballers
Association football goalkeepers
Blackburn Rovers F.C. players
Hyde United F.C. players
St Mirren F.C. players
Stade Rennais F.C. players
Dijon FCO players
FC Sochaux-Montbéliard players
Paris FC players
SO Cholet players
National League (English football) players
Scottish Professional Football League players
Championnat National players
Championnat National 3 players
French expatriate footballers
Guadeloupean expatriate footballers
Expatriate footballers in England
Expatriate footballers in Scotland
French expatriate sportspeople in England
French expatriate sportspeople in Scotland
French people of Guadeloupean descent
Footballers from Val-d'Oise
Djibouti Premier League players
AS Arta/Solar7 players
Expatriate footballers in Djibouti
Black French sportspeople